Solange (died 10 May, c. 880) was a Frankish shepherdess and a locally venerated Christian saint and cephalophore, whose cult is restricted to Sainte-Solange, Cher. Saint Solange was the patron of the traditional Province of Berry, of which Cher is a part.

Solange was born to a poor, but devout family in the town of Villemont, near Bourges, and consecrated her virginity at the age of seven; according to some, her mere presence cured the sick and exorcised devils. The son of the count of Poitiers was highly taken with the beauty and popularity of Solange and approached her when she was tending to her sheep, but she rejected his suit. He argued with her to no avail, and so he decided to abduct her.

At night, he came and took Solange by force, but she struggled so violently that she fell from his horse while he was crossing a stream. Her abductor grew enraged and beheaded her with his sword. According to the fully-developed legend, Solange's severed head invoked three times the Holy Name of Jesus, and like Saint Denis and other saints in Gaulish territories, Solange picked up her head in her own hands and walked with it as far as the church of Saint-Martin in the village of Saint-Martin-du-Crot (which now bears the name of Sainte-Solange, the only commune in France to bear this name), only dropping truly dead there.

Veneration
Immediately, a cult surrounding her grew up. Many miraculous cures were attributed to her intercession. In 1281, an altar was erected in her honor at that church, and it preserved her severed head as a relic and began to call itself the church of St. Solange, while a nearby field where she had prayed began to be referred to as the "Field of St. Solange". It was a habit of the locals, in times of great stress, to form a procession through Bourges with the reliquary head before them and to invoke her against drought.

Solange's feast day in the Roman Catholic Church is May 10.

References

External links 

880 deaths
9th-century births
9th-century Christian saints
9th-century French people
9th-century French women
Saints of West Francia
Catholic martyrs
Cephalophores
Christian child saints
Female saints of medieval France
Executed French women
Executed people from Centre-Val de Loire
Kidnapped French children
Frankish saints
Women from the Carolingian Empire
Miracle workers
Murdered French children
Year of birth unknown
Child sexual abuse in France
Frankish women
People from Bourges